Noah Anthony  Schiavone (born November 7, 1957) is an American sports announcer, professional wrestling commentator and podcaster currently signed with All Elite Wrestling (AEW) as a play-by-play commentator and senior producer. He has previously worked for Jim Crockett Promotions, the World Wrestling Federation (WWF, now WWE), World Championship Wrestling (WCW), and Major League Wrestling (MLW). In addition to his work in wrestling, Schiavone has also worked as a broadcaster for the Gwinnett Braves/Stripers of Minor League Baseball and Georgia Bulldogs football.

In 2013, WWE noted that, "At the height of the Monday Night War, veteran broadcaster Tony Schiavone's voice was as vital to the onscreen product of World Championship Wrestling as Jim Ross' Oklahoma growl was to WWE."

In 2021, Schiavone announced a Kickstarter campaign for a biographical graphic novel titled Butts in Seats: The Tony Schiavone Story. Tony Schiavone can be heard on his podcast What Happened When? with Conrad Thompson.

Early life and education
Schiavone was born and raised in Craigsville, Virginia, the son of Noah and Rebecca Schiavone. He earned a Bachelor of Science degree in communications from James Madison University in 1980.

Broadcasting career

Professional wrestling

Jim Crockett Promotions (1983–1989)
Schiavone broadcast alongside David Crockett starting in 1985 until 1989 on Superstation TBS. Together they hosted NWA's World Championship Wrestling live in front of a small in-studio audience in Atlanta. The show aired on TBS on Saturdays at 9am and 6:05pm and was used as a vehicle to promote live NWA arena events and introduce their stars to a national audience as TBS was the premier nationally broadcast cable station at the time.

World Wrestling Federation (1989–1990)
He was signed by Vince McMahon's WWF for a one-year contract from April 1989 through April 1990. During his time with the company, he was most notable for being the main play-by-play announcer for their SummerSlam 1989 and Royal Rumble 1990 pay-per-views alongside Jesse "The Body" Ventura. Other than Ventura (whom he would also frequently partner later in WCW), Schiavone commentated alongside others including Lord Alfred Hayes, Gorilla Monsoon, Hillbilly Jim, Rod Trongard, and Bobby "The Brain" Heenan. Behind the scenes, Tony produced numerous home videos for Coliseum Video.

Schiavone returned soon afterwards to WCW, the former Crockett promotion by then owned by media mogul Ted Turner. However, he has remained on good terms with the McMahon family in the years since. Years after leaving the WWF he admitted that doing so was his biggest career mistake, and that he asked McMahon for his job back as soon as he realized what the Turner Broadcasting System had done to the former Jim Crockett Promotions upon acquiring it. McMahon turned him down, so that Schiavone would not have to move his young family again, but was open to working with him in the future.

World Championship Wrestling (1990–2001)
Schiavone became the lead voice for WCW's flagship program, Monday Nitro. He also served as the lead announcer of Thunder, typically working alongside Mike Tenay, Bobby Heenan, Larry Zbyszko, and later with Mark Madden and Scott Hudson. Before the advent of Nitro and Thunder, Schiavone hosted WCW Saturday Night and WCW WorldWide. He made an appearance in the movie Ready to Rumble. When WCW's main assets were bought by the World Wrestling Federation (WWF/now WWE) in 2001, he was not retained by WWE.

Total Nonstop Action Wrestling (2003)
Two years later after WCW closed down, Schiavone made an appearance in NWA: Total Nonstop Action (NWA: TNA, later Total Nonstop Action Wrestling) in 2003, during one of their weekly pay-per-views. Schiavone interrupted an interview with Goldylocks and Percy Pringle and proceeded to cut a worked shoot promo in which he insulted both of them. Mike Tenay, TNA's lead broadcaster and Schiavone's former WCW colleague, then entered the ring and the two got into an argument over their careers and what happened during the last days of WCW, where both men lost their jobs. The promo ended when Vince Russo entered the ring and promised Schiavone a job with him. However, nothing ever came of that as Schiavone only made one more appearance in TNA, which was taped that same night after the first appearance.

Major League Wrestling (2017–2019)
On October 5, 2017, Schiavone returned to professional wrestling at the inaugural event of the resurrected Major League Wrestling (MLW). At the show, Schiavone provided color commentary for the event's matches. He then continued to provide his commentary work for MLW's television show, MLW Fusion. After taking a break in early 2019 from commentating due to conflicting schedules, he returned in July 2019. Schiavone noted on the November 20, 2019 Clash of the Champions XIII episode of What Happened When with Conrad Thompson that he would no longer be appearing for Major League Wrestling (MLW).

All Elite Wrestling (2019–present)

In August 2019, it was reported that Schiavone had signed a contract with All Elite Wrestling. It is expected that Schiavone will continue to work with MLW while working for AEW. It was announced that Schiavone would join AEW as a commentator. Schiavone also began working as a senior producer for AEW live events.

On March 25, 2020, due to significant delays with non-audiences, Schiavone filled in on play-by-play commentary for Jim Ross and Excalibur on AEW Dynamite with other substitute announcers Cody, Kenny Omega, Colt Cabana and Chris Jericho.

As of 2022, Schiavone remains a member of the commentary team on AEW Dynamite, while also conducting in-ring and backstage interviews with various professional wrestlers.

Football and baseball
After wrestling, Schiavone became the morning sports anchor for both WDUN in Gainesville and WSB-AM in Atlanta simultaneously, despite the two stations having different owners (WDUN has a partnership with Cox Media Group, which owns WSB-TV and WSB-AM.) Schiavone also has done morning sports reports for Cox sister stations WHIO AM/FM in Dayton, Ohio. Additionally, Schiavone is a writer for the Georgia Bulldogs Radio Network and produced the Best of the Bulldogs, which won the AP Award for Best Sports Program in 2004. Along with being a writer for the Georgia Bulldogs Radio Network, Schiavone also works one of the post game talk shows on the Georgia Bulldogs Radio Network for home and away games alongside former University of Georgia quarterback David Greene.

After a few years of work with the Braves system including pre-game and post-game radio coverage, and also spot duty as an official scorer for games, Schiavone returned to play-by-play duties on radio when the Gwinnett Braves began their first season in Lawrenceville, Georgia as Atlanta's AAA-level affiliate for the 2009–10 season.

Following cutbacks at WSB that resulted in Schiavone being let go in 2015, Schiavone took a part-time job at Starbucks to supplement his income while continuing to do other broadcasting work. Schiavone has stated he had no shame in working there and praised Starbucks for their excellent health insurance coverage for their employees. His time at Starbucks would be alluded to on multiple occasions by Britt Baker on AEW programming.

Podcasting career
On January 30, 2017, Schiavone began hosting the What Happened When? podcast with co-host Conrad Thompson on MLW Radio discussing stories from Schiavone's time with Jim Crockett Promotions, his stint in the WWF and his WCW tenure. Schiavone also co-hosts the "Pro Wrestling Wednesday" podcast with lifelong wrestling fan Beau Le Blanc for WZGC FM 92.9 The Game in Atlanta, a station in which he often does fill-in work for their sports flash updates. On February 20, 2020, All Elite Wrestling and TNT launched AEW Unrestricted, a weekly podcast hosted by Schiavone and referee Aubrey Edwards.

Controversies

Mick Foley incident

An infamous incident involving Schiavone occurred on the January 4, 1999, Nitro. Nitro was airing live against the pre-taped WWF Raw is War on USA Network and was to feature a rematch between WCW World Heavyweight Champion Kevin Nash and former champion Goldberg from Starrcade, where Nash had ended Goldberg's undefeated streak and taken his title under controversial circumstances. The Nitro episode was also the first appearance of "Hollywood" Hulk Hogan since he announced his "retirement" from professional wrestling on the Thanksgiving 1998 edition of The Tonight Show with Jay Leno. Meanwhile, Raw was to feature Mick Foley, who was wrestling as Mankind at the time and who had previously worked for WCW as Cactus Jack, winning his first WWF Championship in a match against The Rock. However, at the time Raw was taped while Nitro was live, and it was a practice for WCW and executive producer Eric Bischoff to spoil pre-taped Raw episodes, by telling the WCW audience the results of the Raw show, and not give fans reasons to change the channel.

According to Foley, who wrote about the incident in the first chapter of his book Foley is Good (and the Real World is Faker than Wrestling), this was to be a pivotal night for WCW as people believed that WCW, whose record streak of 84 consecutive Monday night wins in the ratings had been snapped by Raw in April 1998 and had only eight head-to-head wins after that, would turn the ratings tide back to them and potentially take over the lead in the Monday Night Wars. During the show Schiavone spoiled the result of Raw's main event by saying that Foley, the former Cactus Jack, would win, sarcastically remarking "That's gonna put some butts in the seats".

Foley was genuinely upset by what he had heard and telephoned Schiavone to talk about it. When Schiavone called Foley back, he told Foley that Bischoff had ordered him to reveal Foley's title win over the air. The strategy, however, backfired on Bischoff. Almost immediately after Schiavone spoiled Foley's title win, 600,000 households switched from Nitro to Raw, to watch Foley win the title. This was enough to give the WWF the ratings win for the night, with a 5.7 final rating to Nitro's 5.0. WCW's ratings never saw more than a 5.0 going head-to-head with Raw again and Nitro's rating sank below 5.0 and by the end of the year was struggling to stay above 3.0.

Bobby Heenan rivalry
In a 2002 interview, Schiavone was criticized by Bobby Heenan who claimed that Schiavone would hide finishes and angles from him and fellow Nitro commentator Mike Tenay during broadcasts, claiming Schiavone's key to life is "knowledge is power". Longtime wrestling broadcaster Gene Okerlund concurred with Heenan, and claimed that, while he liked Schiavone and did not have many problems with him, "Tony was the consummate politician" and "Tony watched out for Tony and in doing so, had a tendency to bury people along the way". One tense incident happened on the Nitro following the death of Heenan's longtime best friend Gorilla Monsoon, over Schiavone's alleged objection to mentioning Monsoon on-air (as he had never worked for WCW). Heenan was ultimately allowed to speak in honor of Monsoon, albeit only a small statement. Appearing on The Ross Report in 2014, Schiavone stated that he never objected to Heenan mentioning Monsoon, only that he asked Heenan if he had first asked WCW president Eric Bischoff about doing so. Schiavone accepted responsibility for the collapse of his relationship with Heenan, and said of Heenan's criticism of him: "I deserve it".

Personal life
Schiavone and his wife, the former Lois June Berger, married in 1981 and are the parents of five children. They live in East Cobb, Georgia.

Awards and accomplishments
Wrestling Observer Newsletter
Worst Television Announcer (1999, 2000)

References

External links

 
 
 What Happened When? on Westwood One Podcast Network
 

All Elite Wrestling personnel
American color commentators
American people of Italian descent
American podcasters
American radio sports announcers
James Madison University alumni
Living people
Minor League Baseball broadcasters
People from Atlanta
People from Augusta County, Virginia
Professional wrestling announcers
Professional wrestling podcasters
Sportspeople from Virginia
1957 births